Phrynocephalus helioscopus, the sunwatcher toadhead agama, Fergana toad-headed agama, or sunwatcher, is a species of agamid lizard found in Kazakhstan, S Russia, Turkmenistan, Uzbekistan, Kyrgyzstan, Tajikistan, Turkey, Iraq, China, Mongolia, and Iran.

References

helioscopus
Reptiles described in 1771
Taxa named by Peter Simon Pallas